Zyganisus acalanthis is a moth in the family Cossidae. It is found in Australia, where it has been recorded from southern Western Australia.

The wingspan is 42–44 mm for males. The forewings are grey with black strigulae and lines. The hindwings are grey with indistinct dark markings.

Etymology
The species name refers to the small size of the species and is derived from Latin acalanthis (meaning a small bird).

References

Natural History Museum Lepidoptera generic names catalog

Cossinae
Moths described in 2012